Dichomeris petalodes is a moth in the family Gelechiidae. It was described by Edward Meyrick in 1934. It is found in southern India.

The larvae feed on Bridelia retusa.

References

Moths described in 1934
petalodes